The 1909 Cleveland by-election was held on 9 July 1909.  The by-election was held due to the incumbent Liberal MP, Herbert Samuel, being appointed Chancellor of the Duchy of Lancaster.  It was retained by Samuel.

References

1909 elections in the United Kingdom
1909 in England
20th century in North Yorkshire
July 1909 events
By-elections to the Parliament of the United Kingdom in North Yorkshire constituencies
Ministerial by-elections to the Parliament of the United Kingdom